Kara Liana Braxton (born February 18, 1983) is an American professional basketball player who last played for the New York Liberty of the Women's National Basketball Association (WNBA).

Early life
Kara and her twin sister Kim grew up in a household with four other siblings in Jackson, Michigan.  Her father also played basketball. She played her freshman season at Jackson High and then moved to Oregon.  She and her twin sister later enrolled at Westview High School, in the Portland suburb of Beaverton.

Braxton attended the University of Georgia, and was freshman of the year. She was frequently late to practice and committed other unspecified violations of team rules, and after three suspensions during the 2002–03 season, on February 20, 2004, coach Andy Landers dismissed Braxton from the team. She graduated in 2005.

Georgia statistics
Source

The WNBA
On April 16, 2005, the Shock drafted Braxton in the first round as the seventh overall pick in the annual WNBA draft. She had given birth to a son, Jelani, in January 2005. Jelani's father is Cincinnati Bengals linebacker Odell Thurman.

Braxton was named to the WNBA's All-Rookie team in 2005 after averaging 6.9 points and 3.0 rebounds as a key reserve for the Shock. In 2006, she averaged fewer minutes and points than in her rookie season, but helped the Shock win the WNBA title that year.

In 2007, Braxton became Detroit's starting center after the Shock traded Ruth Riley to the San Antonio Stars.  She averaged 6.0 ppg.  Near the end of the 2007 regular season, the WNBA suspended Braxton for two games after she pled guilty to driving under the influence of alcohol. She was also suspended for the first six games of the 2009 season for a second DUI.

On May 28, 2014, the Liberty waived Braxton.

European career
2005–2006:  TS Wisla Can-Pack Krakow (champion)
2006–2007:  Beşiktaş Cola Turka
2007–2008:  TS Wisla Can-Pack Krakow (champion)
2008–2009:  Galatasaray
2009–2010:   Liaoning Hengye (MVP, champion)
2010–2011:   Liaoning Hengye
2011–2012:   Optimum TED
2012–2013:  Nadezhda Orenburg

Statistics
 A two-time Class 4A player of the year.

References

External links
 WNBA Player Profile
Kara Braxton Q&A

1983 births
Living people
American expatriate basketball people in China
American expatriate basketball people in Poland
American expatriate basketball people in Russia
American expatriate basketball people in Turkey
American women's basketball players
Basketball players from Michigan
Beşiktaş women's basketball players
Centers (basketball)
Detroit Shock players
Galatasaray S.K. (women's basketball) players
Georgia Lady Bulldogs basketball players
Phoenix Mercury players
Sportspeople from Beaverton, Oregon
Tulsa Shock players
Women's National Basketball Association All-Stars
People from Jackson, Michigan
Liaoning Flying Eagles players